Kurdym is a lake in Yrgyz District, Aktobe Region, Kazakhstan.

Geography
Kurdym belongs to the Shalkarteniz basin. The lake basin is fed by snow and in the summer the shallow parts of the lake may dry up. The shores are flat and marshy in places. The water of the lake is salty, unsuitable for drinking. 

Very close to the northwest lies smaller lake Karakol. The last stretch of river Shonkai (Шоңқай), a branch of the Turgay, flows to the southwest. Desert vegetation grows near the lake, including halophytes.

See also
List of lakes of Kazakhstan

References

External links

Shalkar-Nura - An Arid Wilderness and Saiga Sanctuary

Lakes of Aktobe Region
Shalkarteniz basin